The Kraków Land, also known as the Cracow Land, was a land (administrative subdivision) of Poland in the Middle Ages.Jan Długosz: Insigniorum clenodiorum Regis et Regni Polonie descriptio. In: Jan Długosz: Insignia seu Clenodia Regis et Regni Poloniae. It was located in the Lesser Poland, and centered around its capital, Kraków. Since 1138, it was a main land of the Seniorate Province, that in 1227, was replaced by the Duchy of Kraków.J. Wyrozumski: Dzieje Polski piastowskiej (VIII w.-1370). Kraków, Fogra. 1999. ISBN 83-85719-38-5, OCLC 749221743. Around 1314, the area of land was incorporated into Kraków Voivodeship, that was established within the same borders.Z. Gloger: Geografia historyczna ziem dawnej Polski, Kraków 1903.

Symbols 
The coat of arms of the Kraków Land depicted the white (silver) eagle with its head turned right, with a yellow (golden) crown.Barbara Miodońska: Przedstawienie państwa polskiego w Statucie Łaskiego z r. 1506, In: Folia Historiae Artium, vol. 5, Kraków, 1968. p. 34.

Notes

References 

Ziemias
History of Lesser Poland
History of Kraków